Monodontides ternatensis is a butterfly of the family Lycaenidae. It is found on Ternate in the Moluccas.

References

 , 1983. Blue Butterflies of the Lycaenopsis Group: 1-309, 6 pls. London.

Monodontides
Butterflies described in 1983